This is a '''list of universities in Sierra Leone.

Universities in Sierra Leone 
 University of Sierra Leone
 College of Medicine and Allied Health Sciences 
 Eastern Polytechnic
 Atlantic African Oriental Multicultural (ATAFOM) University
 Fourah Bay College
 Njala University
University of Makeni
University of Management and Technology, Sierra Leone
The University of Management and Technology is a private university located in Freetown, Sierra Leone. UNIMTECH educates undergraduate students nationwide. UNIMTECH as three schools: the school of public administration, school of social science, and school of technology, comprising more than 10 fields of study.  UNIMTECH is scattered across the nation in Freetown, Bo, Kono, Lunsar, and Kambia.

 Dura Institute of Development and Management Studies (DIDAMS College)

References

External links
 Universities in Sierra Leone

Sierra Leone
Sierra Leone
Universities